The Outer Limits or Outer Limits may refer to:

Television
The Outer Limits (1963 TV series), a black-and-white science fiction series that aired from 1963 to 1965
The Outer Limits (1995 TV series), a revival of the older series that aired from 1995 to 2002

Music
Outer Limits (band), a Japanese progressive rock band
The Outer Limits (band), 1960s English band
The Outer Limits (album), a 1993 Voivod album
Outerlimits (album), a 1989 Show-Ya album
"Outer Limits" (song), the original title of the 1963 surf rock instrumental "Out of Limits" by The Marketts

Other uses
The Outer Limits: Flight of Fear, former name of an enclosed launched roller coaster built at two Cedar Fair parks 
The Outer Limits (double act), featuring Nigel Planer and Peter Richardson, later members of The Comic Strip

See also

 
 Outer
 Out (disambiguation)
 Limit (disambiguation)